Heteromycteris is a genus of small soles found in both salt and brackish water. Most are native to the northwest Pacific, but H. hartzfeldii and H. oculus are from the Indo-Pacific, and H. capensis is from southern Africa.

Species
There are currently six recognized species in this genus:
 Heteromycteris capensis Kaup, 1858 (Cape sole)
 Heteromycteris hartzfeldii (Bleeker, 1853) (Hook-nosed sole)
 Heteromycteris japonicus (Temminck & Schlegel, 1846) (Bamboo sole)
 Heteromycteris matsubarai Ochiai, 1963
 Heteromycteris oculus (Alcock, 1889) (Eyed sole)
 Heteromycteris proboscideus (Chabanaud, 1925) (True sole)

References

Soleidae
Marine fish genera
Taxa named by Johann Jakob Kaup